Hesychopa is a genus of moths in the subfamily Arctiinae. The genus was described by Turner in 1940.

Species
Hesychopa chionora (Meyrick, 1886)
Hesychopa molybdica Turner, 1940

References

External links

Lithosiini
Moth genera